Bryn–bach, Cefn Cribwr is a Site of Special Scientific Interest in Cefn Cribwr, south Wales.

See also
List of Sites of Special Scientific Interest in Mid & South Glamorgan

Sites of Special Scientific Interest in Mid & South Glamorgan